New Jersey Public Question 1, the Constitutional Amendment To Legalize Marijuana, was a measure that appeared on the November 3, 2020 New Jersey general election ballot. Passing with the largest margin of victory of any statewide cannabis legalization ballot measure in US history, Question 1 legalized the possession and recreational use of cannabis; although planned to go into effect January 1, 2021, implementation was delayed until February 22 due to a dispute between the governor and legislature over penalties for underage cannabis users. Retail sales are also allowed under the amendment.

New Jersey governor Phil Murphy campaigned on legalizing marijuana in the 2017 gubernatorial election. After numerous unsuccessful attempts to implement legalization via the legislature, in 2019, lawmakers voted to put the issue on the November 2020 ballot as a constitutional amendment.

Along with Arizona, Montana and South Dakota, New Jersey is one of four states that legalized recreational marijuana via ballot measures in 2020. New Jersey was the first state to vote on marijuana legalization as a legislative referral rather than a voter-initiated ballot measure; the latter are not permitted under New Jersey law.

Results 
Public Question 1 overwhelmingly passed with 67.1% yes vs 32.9% no. Every county voted at least 60% yes. Monmouth County had the largest number of yes votes, at 244,576, while Camden County had the highest percentage of yes votes, at 75.3%. Middlesex County had the largest number of no votes, at 131,757, while Ocean County had the highest percentage of no votes, at 39.9%.

Results by County

Implementation 

Shortly after voters decisively approved the measure, a bill to decriminalize marijuana in the interim was introduced in the legislature; while it passed in the Senate, approval stalled in the House amid a contentious provision which would lessen the criminal penalties for possession of psilocybin mushrooms. The psilocybin provision was later removed from the decriminalization bill and signed into law as a standalone piece of legislation.

On December 4, 2020, Governor Murphy announced he had reached an agreement with the legislature's leadership on adult-use cannabis sales. The cannabis regulation bill was approved by committees in both legislative houses on December 14 and during a subsequent floor vote by the full assembly three days later. Murphy did not immediately sign the legislation, citing concerns about the lack of penalties for underage marijuana consumption in the decriminalization bill. Although lawmakers initially indicated they would be willing to introduce a new bill to include underage penalties, they subsequently withdrew that offer on January 8 and indicated Murphy would need to sign or veto the enabling legislation as-is.

After several weeks, a revised "cleanup bill" was introduced in the legislature. Compared to the original bill, fines for people aged 18–20 caught with marijuana were reduced to $50 (from the original $500 maximum fine) and "stationhouse adjustments" for minors were replaced with written warnings from police. These changes were made due to concerns from legislators who opposed the original bill on the grounds that police would use the penalties to unfairly target minorities. These changes were still apparently not enough to win majority support, and on February 17, 2021 state senator Nicholas Scutari (who had led the cleanup bill efforts) said "all avenues to clarify [underage penalties] any further are exhausted" and cancelled a planned committee hearing on the bill. However, the rescheduled committee hearing on February 19 saw the "cleanup bill" being approved in a 6-2 vote.

On February 22, 2021, the underage penalties "cleanup" bill was approved by a full vote of the New Jersey Senate and Assembly and was subsequently signed into law by governor Murphy along with the enabling legislation, making New Jersey the 14th state to legalize recreational cannabis. Police strongly objected to a provision of the cleanup bill which prohibited them from informing the parent or guardian of a person under 18's first alcohol or cannabis possession offense; police could only do so after the second offense under the underage penalties law as enacted. In response, legislators began working on a bill that would permit police to notify a parent or guardian upon a minor's first alcohol or cannabis possession offense. Governor Murphy expressed support for the legislation.

On March 25, 2021, both houses of the New Jersey legislature unanimously passed an amendment to the underage penalties law requiring police to notify the parent or guardian of a minor about any alcohol or marijuana possession offenses. The legislation was signed by the governor the following day.

On April 21, 2022, New Jersey cannabis sales legislation finally went into effect - even though it passed by ballot initiative with New Jersey voters back in November 2020.

See also 
2020 Arizona Proposition 207
2020 Montana Initiative 190
2020 South Dakota Constitutional Amendment A
Cannabis in New Jersey

References 

Public Question 1
Cannabis in New Jersey
Cannabis ballot measures in the United States